Prison Commission may refer to:

 Prison Commission (England and Wales) (1877–1963)
 Prison Commission (Scotland) (later "Prison Department", 1877–1939)
 Scottish Prisons Commission (2007–8)